A wine gallon is a unit of capacity that was used routinely in England as far back as the 14th century, and by statute under Queen Anne since 1707. Britain abandoned the wine gallon in 1826 when it adopted imperial units for measurement. The 1707 wine gallon is the basis of the United States' gallon, as well as other measures.

The Imperial gallon was defined with yet another set of temperature and pressure values ( and )

To convert a wine gallon to an Imperial gallon, multiply by 0.833111. To convert an Imperial gallon to a wine gallon, multiply by 1.200320.

Some research concludes that the wine gallon was originally meant to hold 8 troy pounds of wine. A 14th-century barrel of wine contained , which equals one-eighth of the tun of 252 US gallons (954 l; 210 imp gal).

See also
 Gallon

Notes

References

Units of volume